Yevgeni Sergeyevich Dukhnov (born 14 September 1986) is a Russian former professional football player.

Club career
He made his Russian Football National League debut for FC Ufa on 7 August 2012 in a game against FC Rotor Volgograd.

Personal life
His younger brother Vyacheslav Dukhnov is also a footballer.

External links
 

1986 births
Living people
Russian footballers
Association football midfielders
FC Dynamo Stavropol players
FC Ufa players
FC Fakel Voronezh players
FC Armavir players
FC Sakhalin Yuzhno-Sakhalinsk players
FC Avangard Kursk players
FC Neftekhimik Nizhnekamsk players